is a Japanese swimmer. He competed in the men's 100 metre backstroke event at the 2016 Summer Olympics.

References

External links
 

1993 births
Living people
Olympic swimmers of Japan
Swimmers at the 2016 Summer Olympics
Universiade medalists in swimming
Place of birth missing (living people)
Universiade gold medalists for Japan
Japanese male backstroke swimmers
Medalists at the 2015 Summer Universiade
21st-century Japanese people